Josh Hall (born 3 April 1990) is former dual-code professional (Gold Coast Suns Australian rules football and Penrith Panthers National Rugby League) from Townsville in Queensland.

Early life
Hall was born and raised in Townsville, Queensland. He played junior rugby league in his younger years, playing the positions of fullback and centre. He supported the North Queensland Cowboys in the National Rugby League throughout his schooling years at William Ross State High School. As a teenager, Hall decided to focus on High jump with the dream of one day representing Australia at the Olympics.

High jump career
Hall won the bronze medal at the 2007 World Youth Championships in Athletics. He jumped a personal best of 2.26m nine times in 2010 which cleared the B qualifying height for the 2010 Commonwealth Games. However, he was overlooked for the 2010 Australian Commonwealth Games team and decided to take a break from high jump. Later in 2010 he attended training at the Townsvile City Lions AFC as a part of practical work in his sports science degree at James Cook University. Despite only being required to run water initially, the trip would result in Hall playing Australian rules football for the first time at 20 years of age. The following year saw Hall sign up to play senior football for the Curra Swans in the AFL Townsville competition.

After just four games of senior football for Curra, Hall attracted the attention of a Gold Coast Suns Academy scout. Although not officially a part of the team, Hall was invited to play football for the Gold Coast Suns reserves team in 2011 and showed much promise as a ruckman. He also fell 2 centimeters shy of qualifying for the High Jump in the 2012 London Olympics.

AFL career
Hall was drafted with the 94th pick in the 2012 AFL rookie draft by the Gold Coast Suns. After weeks of solid form in the NEAFL, he was selected to play for the Suns senior team for their clash with the Richmond Tigers in Cairns. In his AFL debut he kicked two goals in a two-point victory over Richmond. Hall managed seven senior AFL games over his four-year AFL career before being delisted on 8 September 2015. In a radio interview conducted on 14 September 2015, Hall stated he wanted a contract extension with the Gold Coast and only explored his options after he was made aware that he would not be re-signed.

Statistics

|-
! scope="row" style="text-align:center"| 2012
| || 46|| 2|| 2|| 1|| 5|| 3|| 8|| 4|| 0|| 1.00|| 0.50|| 2.50|| 1.50|| 4.00|| 2.00|| 0.00
|- style="background:#eaeaea;"
! scope="row" style="text-align:center"| 2013
| || 46|| 3|| 1|| 1|| 14|| 11|| 25|| 10|| 5|| 0.33|| 0.33|| 4.67|| 3.67|| 8.33|| 3.33|| 1.67
|- 
! scope="row" style="text-align:center"| 2014
| || 46|| 0|| 0|| 0|| 0|| 0|| 0|| 0|| 0|| 0.00|| 0.00|| 0.00|| 0.00|| 0.00|| 0.00|| 0.00
|- style="background:#eaeaea;"
! scope="row" style="text-align:center"| 2015
| || 46|| 2|| 0|| 0|| 6|| 3|| 9|| 1|| 10|| 0.00|| 0.00|| 3.00|| 1.50|| 4.50|| 0.50|| 5.00
|- class="sortbottom"
! colspan=3|AFL Career
! 7
! 3
! 2
! 25
! 17
! 42
! 15
! 15
! 0.43
! 0.29
! 3.57
! 2.43
! 6.00
! 2.14
! 2.14
|}

NRL career

In May 2015, it was revealed that Hall met with Gold Coast Titans coach Neil Henry at Gold Coast Airport to discuss a potential switch of codes but was informed he would need to prove himself in the Queensland Cup before an NRL contract would be offered. Hall flew to Sydney in August 2015 to meet with Penrith Panthers General Manager Phil Gould where the two discussed switching codes. On 8 September 2015, Hall was signed by the Penrith Panthers on a two-year-deal. Josh played for Penrith's Intrust Super Premiership Team, which is one step below the NRL squad.  He was released at the end of Season 2016.

In 2017, Hall signed with the Townsville Blackhawks upon returning to his hometown.

Return to Australian Rules
Hall signed with the QAFL's Southport Sharks in 2018.

Statistics

References

External links

 Penrith Panthers squad
 
 

1990 births
Living people
Australian rules footballers from Queensland
Australian male high jumpers
Australian rugby league players
Gold Coast Football Club players
James Cook University alumni
Rugby league wingers
Oceanian Athletics Championships winners
Rugby league players from Townsville
Southport Australian Football Club players
Townsville Blackhawks players